Verreos is a surname. Notable people with the surname include:

Nick Verreos (born 1967), American fashion designer, fashion commentator, educator, and author
Rita Verreos (born 1968), American beauty pageant and reality television contestant